Hancun is a town of Zhao County in southern Hebei province, China, located  northeast of the county seat across G20 Qingdao–Yinchuan Expressway. , it has 22 villages under its administration.

See also
List of township-level divisions of Hebei

References

Township-level divisions of Hebei